Deepak Gupta (born September 14, 1977) is an American attorney, known for representing consumers, workers, and a broad range of clients in Supreme Court and appellate cases and constitutional, class action, and complex litigation. Gupta is the founding principal of the law firm Gupta Wessler PLLC and a lecturer at Harvard Law School, where he is an instructor in the Harvard Supreme Court Litigation Clinic.

Early life and education
Gupta earned a Bachelor of Arts degree in philosophy from Fordham University and a Juris Doctor from the Georgetown University Law Center. He also studied Sanskrit at the University of Oxford in England. He served as a law clerk for Judge Lawrence K. Karlton.

Career 
He teaches as a lecturer on law at Harvard Law School, where he is an instructor in the Harvard Supreme Court Litigation Clinic and was previously a Wasserstein Public Interest Fellow, and is a former adjunct professor of Law at Georgetown Law and American University's Washington College of Law. Before entering private practice, he was a senior official at the Consumer Financial Protection Bureau. After leaving the CFPB in 2012, he established the firm now known as Gupta Wessler PLLC. He previously worked for seven years at Public Citizen Litigation Group, where he was staff attorney and the founding director of the Consumer Justice Project and the Alan Morrison Supreme Court Assistance Project Fellow. He is an appointed member of the Administrative Conference of the United States and an elected member of the American Law Institute and serves on the boards of several organizations and academic research institutes, including the board of directors of the Open Markets Institute, the National Consumer Law Center, and the Lawyers' Committee for Civil Rights Under Law.

Deepak Gupta has been considered a potential nominee for a federal judgeship to the United States Court of Appeals for the District of Columbia Circuit by President Joe Biden.

Law360 called him "one of the emerging giants of the appellate and the Supreme Court bar," a "heavy hitter," and a “principled” and "incredibly talented lawyer."

Notable cases
 In 2019, Gupta became the first Asian-American invited by the U.S. Supreme Court to argue as a court-appointed amicus (in support of a judgment left undefended by the U.S. Solicitor General)
 In 2021, Gupta argued and won a unanimous U.S. Supreme Court ruling, in Ford Motor Co. v. Montana Eighth Judicial Dist., on the jurisdictional limits under the Due Process Clause for consumer product liability lawsuits
In 2022, Gupta secured a $125-million nationwide class action settlement in a lawsuit that he led against the federal judiciary, challenging fees for access to the PACER electronic records system.
 In Expressions Hair Design v. Schneiderman, Gupta successfully represented retail merchants before the United States Supreme Court in a First Amendment challenge to law designed to hide the costs of credit cards.
Gupta argued the case of AT&T Mobility v. Concepcion for the respondent before the United States Supreme Court. This landmark case concerned the validity of forced arbitration clauses used by companies to suppress group claims of discrimination, harassment, wage theft, deceptive practices, and predatory lending. Gupta is a leading advocate against forced arbitration clauses.

References

Living people
American lawyers
Georgetown University Law Center alumni
Fordham University alumni
United States Department of Justice lawyers
American Civil Liberties Union people
1977 births
American politicians of Indian descent